WRTO (1200 AM) is a radio station broadcasting a Spanish sports format. Licensed to Chicago, Illinois, United States, the station serves the Chicago area.  It is owned by Latino Media Network; under a local marketing agreement, it is programmed by previous owner TelevisaUnivision's Uforia Audio Network. WRTO features local programming as well as shows originating at other Uforia Audio Network stations.

The station is the flagship station of the Chicago Fire of Major League Soccer and the Chicago Bears of the National Football League. It also broadcasts select Chicago Bulls, Chicago Cubs, Chicago White Sox and Chicago Blackhawks games in Spanish.

History
The station began broadcasting in January 1990, and held the call sign WOPA. It was owned by CID Broadcasting Inc. In 1993, its format was changed from Regional Mexican to Spanish AC. In 1995, the station was sold to Heftel Broadcasting for $4.5 million. Concurrent with the sale, its call sign was changed to WLXX, and it switched back to a Regional Mexican format branded "La X". On September 20, 1996, the station adopted a tropical music format. On January 12, 2003, the station adopted a Spanish hot AC format branded "Viva", simulcasting 103.1 WXXY. On January 17, 2003, its call sign was changed to WVIV, while its FM sister station's call sign was changed to WVIV-FM.

In October 2003, the station's call sign was changed to WRTO, and it began airing Spanish-language talk programming, which Univision Radio had moved from AM 560 WIND. It became a full time Spanish-language news/talk station in February 2004. WRTO became a part of the Univision America talk radio network on July 4, 2012. While the network itself ceased operations in 2015, WRTO aired remnants of Univision America's programming, as well as its local news, sports, and weather. On March 16, 2017, the station switched to a Spanish language all-sports format, as an affiliate of Univision Deportes.

WRTO was one of eighteen radio stations that TelevisaUnivision sold to Latino Media Network in a $60 million deal announced in June 2022, approved by the Federal Communications Commission (FCC) that November, and completed in January 2023. Under the terms of the deal, Univision agreed to continue programming the station for up to one year under a local marketing agreement.

References

External links

Hispanic and Latino American culture in Chicago
Sports radio stations in the United States
RTO
RTO
Univision Radio Network stations
Radio stations established in 1990
1990 establishments in Illinois